This is a discography of Native American flute player R. Carlos Nakai.

Discography 
 Changes (1983, Canyon Records)
 Cycles (1985, Canyon Records)
 Journeys (1986, Canyon Records)
 Jackalope (1986, Canyon Records) with Jackalope
 Earth Spirit (1987, Canyon Records)
 Sundance Season (1988, Celestial Harmonies)
 Carry the Gift (1988, Canyon Records) with William Eaton  
 Desert Dance (1988, Celestial Harmonies)
 Canyon Trilogy (1989, Canyon Records)
 Winter Dreams (1990, Canyon Records) with William Eaton
 Natives (1990, Silver Wave Records) with Peter Kater
 Spirit Horses (1991, Canyon Records) with James DeMars
 Emergence: Songs of the Rainbow World (1992, Canyon Records)
 Ancestral Voices (1992, Canyon Records) with William Eaton
 Weavings (1992, Canyon Records) with Jackalope
 Migration (1992, Silver Wave Records) with Peter Kater, David Darling, Paul McCandless and Mark Miller   
 Boat People (A Musical Codex) (1993, Canyon Records) with Jackalope
 Dances With Rabbits (1993, Canyon Records) with Jackalope
 How the West Was Lost (1993, Silver Wave Records) with Peter Kater
 Honorable Sky (1994, Silver Wave Records) with Peter Kater, David Darling, Paul McCandles and Mark Miller
 Native Tapestry (1994, Canyon Records) with James DeMars
 Island of Bows (1994, Canyon Records) with Wind Travelin' Band, Shonosuke Okhura and Oki Kano
 Feather, Stone & Light (1995, Canyon Records) with William Eaton and Will Clipman  
 Awakening the Fire (1995, Canyon Records) with Will Clipman 
 How the West Was Lost Volume Two (1995, Silver Wave Records) with Peter Kater
 Kokopelli's Cafe (1996, Canyon Records) with The R. Carlos Nakai Quartet
 Improvisations in Concert (1996, Silver Wave Records) with Peter Kater
 Two World Concerto (1997, Canyon Records) with James DeMars
 Inside Canyon de Chelly (1997, Canyon Records) with Paul Horn
 Mythic Dreamer (1998, Canyon Records)
 Red Wind (1998, Canyon Records) with William Eaton and Will Clipman  
 Winds of Devotion (1998, EarthSea Records) with Nawang Khechog
 Inside Monument Valley (1999, Canyon Records) with Paul Horn 
 Inner Voices (1999, Canyon Records)  
 Big Medicine (1999, Canyon Records) with The R. Carlos Nakai Quartet
 Ancient Future (2000, Canyon Records) with The R. Carlos Nakai Quartet
 In a Distant Place (2000, Canyon Records) with William Eaton, Will Clipman and Nawang Khechog
 Edge of the Century (2001, Canyon Records) with AmoChip Dabney
 Enter >> Tribal (2001, Canyon Records)
 Through Windows & Walls (2001, Silver Wave Records) with Peter Kater
 Fourth World (2002, Canyon Records)
 Sanctuary (2003, Canyon Records)
 In Beauty, We Return (2004, Canyon Records)
 People of Peace (2005, Canyon Records) with The R. Carlos Nakai Quartet
 Our Beloved Land (2005, Canyon Records) with Keola Beamer
 Reconnections (2006, Canyon Records) with Cliff Sarde, William Eaton and Randy Wood
 Voyagers (2007, Canyon Records) with Udi Bar-David
 Talisman (2008, Canyon Records)
 Guadalupe, Our Lady of the Roses (2008, Canyon Records) with James DeMars, Isola Jones, Robert Breault, Carole FitzPatrick and Robert Barefield
 Dancing into Silence (2010, Canyon Records) with William Eaton and Will Clipman
 Ritual (2014, Mysterium Music) with Peter Kater, Paul McCandless, Jaques Morelenbaum and Trisha Bowden
 What Lies Beyond (2016, Canyon Records)
 Nocturne (2020, Canyon Records)

Compilation appearances
Narada Film and Television Music Sampler (1998, EMI)
The Rough Guide to Native American Music (1999, World Music Network)

References

Discographies of American artists
Native American music